Kałki  is a village in the administrative district of Gmina Trzebiel, within Żary County, Lubusz Voivodeship, in western Poland, close to the German border.

Since the Middle Ages, the village was at various times part of Poland, Bohemia (Czechia) and Saxony. In 1815, following the Congress of Vienna, it was annexed by Prussia, and from 1871 to 1945 it was also part of Germany, before it became again part of Poland following the defeat of Nazi Germany in World War II.

References

Villages in Żary County